RQS may refer to:

Request for Qualification Statements, in the U.S. Government, a part of the General Services Administration's purchasing process
  the Directorate of Resource Quality Services, in the South African government, a part of the Department of Water Affairs and Forestry
 Regional Qualifying Score in U.S. NCAA Women's Collegiate Gymnastics
 Request Service, related to GPIB communication
"Raytown Quality Schools," or Raytown C-2 School District

See also
 RQ (disambiguation)